Hpa-an Township (Phlone ;) is a township of Hpa-an District in the Kayin State of Myanmar. The principal town is Hpa-An.

References 

Townships of Kayin State